Metoncholaimus is a genus of nematodes belonging to the family Oncholaimidae.

The genus has almost cosmopolitan distribution.

Species:

Metoncholaimus albidus 
Metoncholaimus amplus 
Metoncholaimus antarcticus 
Metoncholaimus anthophorus 
Metoncholaimus demani 
Metoncholaimus denticaudatus 
Metoncholaimus filispiculum 
Metoncholaimus haplotretos 
Metoncholaimus intermedius 
Metoncholaimus isopapillatus 
Metoncholaimus longiovum 
Metoncholaimus medispiculatum 
Metoncholaimus moles 
Metoncholaimus murphyi 
Metoncholaimus paracavatus 
Metoncholaimus parasimplex 
Metoncholaimus pelor 
Metoncholaimus perdisus 
Metoncholaimus pristiurus 
Metoncholaimus sanmatiensis 
Metoncholaimus scissus 
Metoncholaimus siddiqii 
Metoncholaimus simplex 
Metoncholaimus trichospiculum 
Metoncholaimus unguentarius 
Metoncholaimus uvifer

References

Nematodes